The Horse Soldiers is a 1959 American adventure war western film set during the American Civil War directed by John Ford and starring John Wayne, William Holden and Constance Towers. The screenplay by John Lee Mahin and Martin Rackin was loosely based on Harold Sinclair's 1956 novel of the same name, a fictionalized version of Grierson's Raid in Mississippi.

Plot
A Union cavalry brigade led by Colonel John Marlowe—a railroad construction engineer in civilian life—is sent on a raid behind Confederate lines to destroy a railroad and supply depot at Newton Station. Major Henry Kendall, a regimental surgeon who is torn between duty and the horror of war, is constantly at odds with Marlowe.

While the unit rests at Greenbriar Plantation, Miss Hannah Hunter, the plantation's mistress, acts as a gracious hostess to the unit's officers. But she and her slave, Lukey, eavesdrop on a staff meeting as Marlowe discusses his battle strategy. To protect the secrecy of the mission, Marlowe is forced to take the two women with him. Initially hostile to her Yankee captor, Miss Hunter gradually comes to respect him and eventually falls in love with him. In addition to Kendall and Miss Hunter, Marlowe also must contend with Col. Phil Secord, a politically ambitious officer who continually second-guesses Marlowe's orders and command decisions.

Several battles ensue, including the capture of Newton Station, later a fire fight during which Lukey is killed, and a skirmish with boy cadets from a local military school (based on the actual Battle of New Market). After destroying the crucial supply line, and with Confederate forces in pursuit, the brigade reaches a bridge that must be stormed in order to access the Union lines. After taking the bridge, Marlowe's men rig it with explosive charges, and Marlowe bids Hannah farewell. Kendall chooses to remain behind with some badly wounded men, knowing he will be captured with them, rather than leave them unattended until Confederate medical personnel arrive.

Marlowe, though wounded, kisses Miss Hunter goodbye, lights the fuse and is the last of his men to cross the bridge before it is destroyed, halting the Confederate advance. Their mission accomplished, he and his brigade continue on toward Baton Rouge. Marlowe's Union cavalrymen belt out the song When Johnny Comes Marching Home, with the last line changed to "And we'll all raise hell when Johnny comes marching home.

Cast
 John Wayne as Colonel John Marlowe
 William Holden as Major Henry 'Hank' Kendall
 Constance Towers as Miss Hannah Hunter of Greenbriar
 Althea Gibson as Lukey, Miss Hunter's maid
 Judson Pratt as Sergeant Major Kirby
 Ken Curtis as Cpl. Wilkie
 Willis Bouchey as Col. Phil Secord
 Bing Russell as Dunker, Yankee Soldier Amputee
 O.Z. Whitehead as Otis 'Hoppy' Hopkins (medical assistant)
 Hank Worden as Deacon Clump
 Chuck Hayward as Captain Winters
 Denver Pyle as Jackie Jo (rebel deserter)
 Strother Martin as Virgil (rebel deserter)
 Basil Ruysdael as the Reverend (Jefferson Military Academy)
 Carleton Young as Col. Jonathan Miles, CSA
 William Leslie as Maj. Richard Gray
 William Henry as Confederate lieutenant
 Walter Reed as Union officer
 Anna Lee as Mrs. Buford
 William Forrest as Gen. Steve Hurlburt
 Ron Hagerthy as Bugler
 Russell Simpson as Acting Sheriff Henry Goodbody
 Hoot Gibson as Sgt. Brown
 Jack Pennick as Sgt. Maj. Mitch Mitchell (uncredited) Senior member of John Ford's Stock Company
 Stan Jones as Gen. Ulysses S. Grant (uncredited)
 Richard H. Cutting as Gen. William Tecumseh Sherman (uncredited)

Production
Exterior scenes were filmed in Natchitoches Parish, Louisiana, along the banks of Cane River Lake, and in and around Natchez, Mississippi. The film company built a bridge over the Cane River for the pivotal battle scene, and many locals were hired as extras. It also features scenes shot in Wildwood Regional Park in Thousand Oaks, California. The film used DeLuxe Color.

Holden and Wayne both received $750,000 for starring, a record salary at the time. The project was plagued from the start by cost overruns, discord, and tragedy.  Holden and Ford argued incessantly. Wayne was preoccupied with pre-production logistics for The Alamo. Lukey's dialog was originally written in "Negro" dialect that Althea Gibson, the former Wimbledon and U.S. National tennis champion who was cast in the role, found offensive. She informed Ford that she would not deliver her lines as written. Though Ford was notorious for his intolerance of actors' demands, he agreed to modify the script.

During filming of the climactic battle scene, veteran stuntman Fred Kennedy suffered a broken neck while performing a horse fall and died. "Ford was completely devastated," wrote biographer Joseph Malham. "[He] felt a deep responsibility for the lives of the men who served under him." The film was scripted to end with the triumphant arrival of Marlowe's forces in Baton Rouge, but Ford "simply lost interest" after Kennedy's death. He ended the film with Marlowe's farewell to Hannah Hunter before crossing and blowing up the bridge.

Reception
The film opened at number one in the United States but the film was a commercial failure; analysts said this was due largely to Wayne's and Holden's high salaries, and the complex participation of multiple production companies. The response of audiences and critics was "lackluster".

Historical accuracy
The film was loosely based on Harold Sinclair's 1956 novel of the same name, which in turn was based on the historic 17-day Grierson's Raid and Battle of Newton's Station in Mississippi during the Civil War.

In April 1863, Colonel Benjamin Grierson led 1,700 Illinois and Iowa soldiers from LaGrange, Tennessee to Baton Rouge, Louisiana, through several hundred miles of enemy territory, destroying Confederate railroad and supply lines between Newton's Station and Vicksburg, Mississippi. The mission was part of the Union Army's successful Vicksburg campaign to gain control over boat traffic on the Mississippi River, culminating in the Battle of Vicksburg. Grierson's destruction of Confederate-controlled rail links and supplies played an important role in disrupting Confederate General John C. Pemberton's strategies and troop deployments. Union General William Tecumseh Sherman reportedly described Grierson's daring mission as "the most brilliant of the war".

Though based loosely on Grierson's Raid, The Horse Soldiers is a fictional account that departs considerably from the actual events. The real-life protagonist, a music teacher named Benjamin Grierson, becomes railroad engineer John Marlowe in the film. Hannah Hunter, Marlowe's love interest, has no historical counterpart. Numerous other details were altered as well, "to streamline and popularize the story for the non-history buffs who would make up a large part of the audience."

Dr. Erastus Dean Yule, the real-life surgeon counterpart of Major Hank Kendall, actually did volunteer to stay behind and get captured by the Confederates with the casualties who were too wounded to continue. The raid actually took place about a year before the notorious Andersonville POW camp was built, and he was eventually exchanged after several months as a POW.

See also
 John Wayne filmography
 Hoot Gibson filmography

References

External links

 
 
 
 
 

1959 films
United Artists films
Films directed by John Ford
American Civil War films
Films set in Mississippi
Natchitoches, Louisiana
Films about the United States Army
Films scored by David Buttolph
American historical films
1950s historical films
1950s English-language films
1950s American films